The Order of Montreal is a municipal order awarded to residents of the city of Montreal. It was established in May 2016, by then-mayor Denis Coderre.

History 
Montreal held a design competition for artists to design the medals that would be presented to recipients of the Order of Montreal; the winning design was made by Jacques Desbiens. As a municipal order, it is not directly ranked in the Canadian honours system.

The Order, like the Order of Canada and National Order of Quebec, has three ranks consisting of (in descending order) commander, officer, and knight. Each year, three commanders, six officers, and eight knights are invested. All recipients of that honour were awarded the Order of Montreal in December 2016 with the rank of Commander.

See also 
 Order of Hamilton

References

External links 
 
 

Quebec awards
Awards established in 2016
2016 establishments in Quebec
Culture of Montreal